The 2022 Cuban local elections were held on 27 November 2022. They were boycotted by the opposition.

References 

2022 elections in the Caribbean
Local elections
2022
November 2022 events in North America